Tor Graves (born Torsak Sriachavanon,  March 26, 1972) is a Thai racing driver. He is currently competing in the FIA World Endurance Championship.

Career summary

† - Team standings.

24 Hours of Le Mans results

Complete WeatherTech SportsCar Championship results
(key) (Races in bold indicate pole position; results in italics indicate fastest lap)

References

External links

Facebook

1972 births
Living people
Tor Graves
British Formula Renault 2.0 drivers
International Formula Master drivers
British Formula Three Championship drivers
Auto GP drivers
European Le Mans Series drivers
24 Hours of Le Mans drivers
FIA World Endurance Championship drivers
24 Hours of Daytona drivers
WeatherTech SportsCar Championship drivers
Manor Motorsport drivers

Piquet GP drivers
Alan Docking Racing drivers
Starworks Motorsport drivers
Tor Graves